An explosion is a sudden increase in volume and release of energy in an extreme manner.

Explosion, Explosive, Explode or Exploder may also refer to:

Film 
 Explosion (1923 film), a 1923 German silent film
 Explosion (1973 film), a 1973 Romanian film
 Explosion (2014 film), a 2015 American drama film directed by Matt Sobel

Music

Bands
 The Explosion, an American punk rock band formed in 1998
 The Exploders, an Australian alternative rock band formed in 2005
 The Explosive, an English psychedelic rock band 1968–1971
 The Explosives, a backing band for Roky Erickson

Albums
 Explode (album), by the Unseen, or the title song, 2003
 Explosion! The Sound of Slide Hampton, 1962
 Explosions (Bob James album) or the title instrumental, 1965
 Explosions (Three Days Grace album) or the title song, 2022
 The Explosion (EP), by the Explosion, 2000

Songs
 "Explode" (Cover Drive song), 2012
 "Explode" (Nelly Furtado song), 2003
 "Explode", by Big Freedia, 2014
 "Explode", by Charli XCX from The Angry Birds Movie soundtrack, 2016
 "Explode", by Damageplan from New Found Power, 2004
 "Exploder", by Audioslave from Audioslave, 2002
 "Explosion", by Black Eyed Peas and Anitta, 2019
 "Explosion", by Nicky Byrne from Sunlight, 2016
 "Explosions" (song), by Ellie Goulding, 2013

Other uses
 Explosion, a brand name for methylone
 ex.plode.us, a defunct Internet search engine
 Explosion! Museum of Naval Firepower, in Gosport, Hampshire, England
 Exploder, a mechanism used to fire the warhead of a torpedo
 Explosive material, a substance that can produce an explosion
 "Explode" (Space Ghost Coast to Coast), an episode of Space Ghost Coast to Coast

See also

 Combinatorial explosion, in mathematics, the effect of functions that grow very rapidly as a result of combinatorial considerations
 Deductive explosion, the phenomenon that logical inconsistency or a provable contradiction may permit to prove everything
 
 
 
 Xplosion (disambiguation)